ATN B4U Movies is a Canadian Category B specialty channel owned by Asian Television Network International. It broadcasts programming from B4U Movies and Canadian content. Programming consists of Bollywood movies and other Bollywood film based programming in Hindi.

History

ATN B4U Movies was originally launched as a pay service in March 2001 using the following license.  However, on September 25, 2012, this license was revoked at ATN's request. The channel subsequently re-launched as a regular specialty service on June 17, 2012, under the following license: ATN Hindi Movie Channel 3.

References

External links
 
 B4U Movies

Digital cable television networks in Canada
Movie channels in Canada
Television channels and stations established in 2004
Hindi-language television in Canada